Jalen Mayfield (born May 23, 2000) is an American football guard for the Atlanta Falcons of the National Football League (NFL). He played college football at Michigan, and was drafted by the Falcons in the third round of the 2021 NFL Draft.

Early life and high school
Mayfield grew up in Grand Rapids, Michigan, and attended Catholic Central High School, where he was a four year starter at offensive tackle and defensive end for the football team. Mayfield originally committed to play college football at Minnesota in February of this junior year, but eventually flipped his commitment to Michigan three months later. As a senior, he was named The Grand Rapids Press Defensive Player of the Year after recording 96 tackles, 31 tackles for loss, 17 sacks, and 3 fumble recoveries and played in the U.S. Army All-American Bowl.

College career
Mayfield played in three games at left tackle as a true freshman. He was named the Wolverines' starting right tackle going into his sophomore year and was named honorable mention All-Big Ten Conference after starting all 13 of Michigan's games. Following the 2020 season, Mayfield announced that he would forgo his remaining years of college eligibility and enter the 2021 NFL Draft.

Professional career

Mayfield was selected by the Atlanta Falcons in the third round (68th overall) of the 2021 NFL Draft. He signed his four-year rookie contract with Atlanta on June 15, 2021.

2021 season: Rookie year

Heading into his first NFL training camp, Mayfield competed with Kaleb McGary to be the Falcons' starting right tackle.  Due to injuries suffered by offensive guards Josh Andrews and Matt Gono, however, Mayfield began taking first-team reps at left guard.  At the conclusion of the NFL preseason, Mayfield was named the starting left guard for the Falcons.  

Mayfield made his first career start and NFL debut in the Falcons' Week 1 loss to the Philadelphia Eagles, playing in 90% of the team's offensive snaps  After this game, he would appear in every single offensive snap for the Falcons until Week 17, when an injury suffered late in the fourth quarter of the Falcons' loss to the Buffalo Bills kept him out of the Falcons' Week 18 season finale against the New Orleans Saints.

Overall, Mayfield finished his rookie season appearing in 16 games and starts.

2022 season
On September 1, 2022, Mayfield was placed on injured reserve.

References

External links 

Atlanta Falcons bio
Michigan Wolverines bio

2000 births
Living people
American football offensive tackles
American football offensive guards
Players of American football from Grand Rapids, Michigan
Michigan Wolverines football players
Atlanta Falcons players